In Greek mythology, the name Hyperes (Ancient Greek: Ὑπέρης, gen. Ὑπέρητος) may refer to:

Hyperes, an Arcadian prince as the son of King Lycaon and the eponym of Hyperesia in Achaea.
Hyperes, a Boeotian son of Poseidon and the Pleiad Alcyone, and brother of Anthas. He was the father of Arethusa, mother of Abas by Poseidon. Hyperes and his brother Anthas reigned over what later became Troezen and were founders of the cities Hyperea and Anthea respectively. Two brands of Troezenian wine, Anthedonias and Hypereias, were believed to have been named after certain "Anthus and Hyperus", who apparently are the same figures. See also Hyperenor.
Hyperes, another Boeotian as son of Melas and Eurycleia. He lived by a spring which was named Hypereia after him.

Notes

References 

 Athenaeus of Naucratis, The Deipnosophists or Banquet of the Learned. London. Henry G. Bohn, York Street, Covent Garden. 1854. Online version at the Perseus Digital Library.
 Athenaeus of Naucratis, Deipnosophistae. Kaibel. In Aedibus B.G. Teubneri. Lipsiae. 1887. Greek text available at the Perseus Digital Library.
 Hesiod, Catalogue of Women from Homeric Hymns, Epic Cycle, Homerica translated by Evelyn-White, H G. Loeb Classical Library Volume 57. London: William Heinemann, 1914. Online version at theio.com
 Lucius Mestrius Plutarchus, Moralia with an English Translation by Frank Cole Babbitt. Cambridge, MA. Harvard University Press. London. William Heinemann Ltd. 1936. Online version at the Perseus Digital Library. Greek text available from the same website.
 Pausanias, Description of Greece with an English Translation by W.H.S. Jones, Litt.D., and H.A. Ormerod, M.A., in 4 Volumes. Cambridge, MA, Harvard University Press; London, William Heinemann Ltd. 1918. . Online version at the Perseus Digital Library
 Pausanias, Graeciae Descriptio. 3 vols. Leipzig, Teubner. 1903.  Greek text available at the Perseus Digital Library.
 Stephanus of Byzantium, Stephani Byzantii Ethnicorum quae supersunt, edited by August Meineike (1790-1870), published 1849. A few entries from this important ancient handbook of place names have been translated by Brady Kiesling. Online version at the Topos Text Project.

Children of Poseidon
Demigods in classical mythology
Family of Athamas
Boeotian characters in Greek mythology
Mythology of Achaea
Troezenian mythology